Roch Castonguay is a Canadian film and television actor, who starred in the television shows Francoeur and sitcom Météo+.

Early life
Castonguay is from Prescott and Russell Counties, Ontario.

In 1979, he founded the Théâtre de la Vieille, with Jean Marc Dalpé,
Robert Bellefeuille, and Lise L. Roy.

In 2005, he performed Une Saison en enfer.
In 2007, he appeared in L'homme invisible.

Career

Theatre
 1998 : L'été dernier à Golden Pond : ???
 ??? : The invisible man

Film
 1989 - The Party (Le Party)
 2001 - February 15, 1839 (Nouvelle-France)
 2004 - Two Brothers
 2022 - The Switch (La Switch)

Television series
 ???: Le Sorcier : ???
 1999: Science Point Com : ???
 2000: Fortier : ???
 2003: Francoeur : Henri Letourneau
 2007: Pointe-aux-chimères : ???
 2008: Météo+ : Spare Change
 2016: St. Nickel''

References

Year of birth missing (living people)
Living people
Canadian male television actors
Canadian male film actors
Canadian male stage actors
Franco-Ontarian people
People from the United Counties of Prescott and Russell
Male actors from Ontario